Bridewort is a common name for several plants and may refer to:

 Filipendula ulmaria
 Spiraea salicifolia
 Spiraea alba, the pale bridewort